The masonry Radomyshl Synagogue was located in the town of Radomyshl, Zhytomyr Oblast in Ukraine. It was built in 1887. A great fire in the town in 1926 damaged the building. It was demolished in the 1930s.

See also
 List of synagogues in Ukraine
 History of the Jews in Ukraine

References

Former synagogues in Ukraine
Synagogues in Ukraine
Destroyed synagogues
Zhytomyr Oblast